Nedyalko Hubenov (born 23 August 1979) is a Bulgarian footballer who currently plays for Dimitrovgrad. Hubenov plays in a wingback position.

During his time with Haskovo, he frequently served as the team captain.

Honours

Club 
Lokomotiv Plovdiv
 Bulgarian A Group: 2003–04

References

External links 
 
 

1979 births
Living people
Bulgarian footballers
FC Haskovo players
PFC Lokomotiv Plovdiv players
FC Dunav Ruse players
FC Lyubimets players
First Professional Football League (Bulgaria) players
Association football midfielders
People from Haskovo
Sportspeople from Haskovo Province